The 1972–73 Philadelphia Flyers season was the Philadelphia Flyers' sixth season in the National Hockey League (NHL). The Flyers earned the nickname "Broad Street Bullies" en route to their first winning season and first playoff series victory, beating the Minnesota North Stars, before losing in the semifinals to the Montreal Canadiens.

Regular season

It was during the 1972–73 season that the Flyers shed the mediocre expansion team label by recording their first winning season and becoming known as the intimidating "Broad Street Bullies", a nickname coined by Jack Chevalier and Pete Cafone of the Philadelphia Bulletin on January 3, 1973 after a 3–1 brawling victory over the Atlanta Flames that led Chevalier to write in his game account, "The image of the fightin' Flyers spreading gradually around the NHL, and people are dreaming up wild nicknames. They're the Mean Machine, the Bullies of Broad Street and Freddy's Philistines." Cafone wrote the accompanying headline, "Broad Street Bullies Muscle Atlanta".

That same month Bobby Clarke was the youngest player (at that time) in NHL history to be named team captain, replacing Ed Van Impe who had stepped aside in favor of Clarke. Rick MacLeish became the first Flyer to score 50 goals in a season.

After the season, Clarke was awarded the Hart Memorial Trophy as the NHL's Most Valuable Player.

Season standings

Playoffs
An overtime goal by Gary Dornhoefer in Game 5 turned the tide of their first round series with the Minnesota North Stars in the Flyers' favor, as the Flyers got their first playoff series win in six games. The goal was later immortalized as a bronze statue on the south side of the Spectrum. They were outmatched in the semi-finals by the Montreal Canadiens, however, losing in five games.

Schedule and results

Regular season

|- style="background:#ffc;"
| 1 || October 7 || @ St. Louis Blues || 4–4 || 0–0–1 || 1 || 
|- style="background:#cfc;"
| 2 || October 12 || Vancouver Canucks || 7–3 || 1–0–1 || 3 || 
|- style="background:#fcf;"
| 3 || October 14 || @ Detroit Red Wings || 0–5 || 1–1–1 || 3 || 
|- style="background:#fcf;"
| 4 || October 15 || California Golden Seals || 1–4 || 1–2–1 || 3 || 
|- style="background:#cfc;"
| 5 || October 18 || @ Los Angeles Kings || 4–3 || 2–2–1 || 5 || 
|- style="background:#ffc;"
| 6 || October 20 || @ California Golden Seals || 3–3 || 2–2–2 || 6 || 
|- style="background:#fcf;"
| 7 || October 25 || @ New York Rangers || 1–6 || 2–3–2 || 6 || 
|- style="background:#cfc;"
| 8 || October 26 || Detroit Red Wings || 2–1 || 3–3–2 || 8 || 
|- style="background:#fcf;"
| 9 || October 28 || @ Minnesota North Stars || 1–2 || 3–4–2 || 8 || 
|- style="background:#cfc;"
| 10 || October 29 || Toronto Maple Leafs || 5–2 || 4–4–2 || 10 || 
|-

|- style="background:#cfc;"
| 11 || November 2 || Pittsburgh Penguins || 4–2 || 5–4–2 || 12 || 
|- style="background:#cfc;"
| 12 || November 4 || Buffalo Sabres || 5–3 || 6–4–2 || 14 || 
|- style="background:#fcf;"
| 13 || November 5 || New York Rangers || 2–3 || 6–5–2 || 14 || 
|- style="background:#fcf;"
| 14 || November 8 || @ Pittsburgh Penguins || 2–5 || 6–6–2 || 14 || 
|- style="background:#cfc;"
| 15 || November 9 || Chicago Black Hawks || 5–3 || 7–6–2 || 16 || 
|- style="background:#cfc;"
| 16 || November 11 || Buffalo Sabres || 3–1 || 8–6–2 || 18 || 
|- style="background:#cfc;"
| 17 || November 12 || California Golden Seals || 8–3 || 9–6–2 || 20 || 
|- style="background:#fcf;"
| 18 || November 15 || @ New York Rangers || 3–7 || 9–7–2 || 20 || 
|- style="background:#fcf;"
| 19 || November 16 || @ Montreal Canadiens || 5–6 || 9–8–2 || 20 || 
|- style="background:#fcf;"
| 20 || November 19 || @ Atlanta Flames || 2–3 || 9–9–2 || 20 || 
|- style="background:#cfc;"
| 21 || November 22 || New York Islanders || 5–3 || 10–9–2 || 22 || 
|- style="background:#fcf;"
| 22 || November 25 || @ Detroit Red Wings || 4–6 || 10–10–2 || 22 || 
|- style="background:#fcf;"
| 23 || November 26 || @ Boston Bruins || 4–6 || 10–11–2 || 22 || 
|- style="background:#ffc;"
| 24 || November 30 || Atlanta Flames || 5–5 || 10–11–3 || 23 || 
|-

|- style="background:#ffc;"
| 25 || December 2 || @ Toronto Maple Leafs || 2–2 || 10–11–4 || 24 || 
|- style="background:#cfc;"
| 26 || December 3 || Montreal Canadiens || 5–2 || 11–11–4 || 26 || 
|- style="background:#cfc;"
| 27 || December 7 || Minnesota North Stars || 6–2 || 12–11–4 || 28 || 
|- style="background:#fcf;"
| 28 || December 9 || Boston Bruins || 3–4 || 12–12–4 || 28 || 
|- style="background:#cfc;"
| 29 || December 10 || Toronto Maple Leafs || 5–2 || 13–12–4 || 30 || 
|- style="background:#fcf;"
| 30 || December 13 || @ Minnesota North Stars || 2–7 || 13–13–4 || 30 || 
|- style="background:#cfc;"
| 31 || December 14 || St. Louis Blues || 5–3 || 14–13–4 || 32 || 
|- style="background:#cfc;"
| 32 || December 16 || @ New York Islanders || 2–1 || 15–13–4 || 34 || 
|- style="background:#fcf;"
| 33 || December 17 || Boston Bruins || 3–5 || 15–14–4 || 34 || 
|- style="background:#fcf;"
| 34 || December 20 || @ Chicago Black Hawks || 1–4 || 15–15–4 || 34 || 
|- style="background:#cfc;"
| 35 || December 21 || Los Angeles Kings || 6–3 || 16–15–4 || 36 || 
|- style="background:#fcf;"
| 36 || December 23 || @ St. Louis Blues || 1–6 || 16–16–4 || 36 || 
|- style="background:#ffc;"
| 37 || December 27 || @ California Golden Seals || 2–2 || 16–16–5 || 37 || 
|- style="background:#ffc;"
| 38 || December 29 || @ Vancouver Canucks || 4–4 || 16–16–6 || 38 || 
|- style="background:#fcf;"
| 39 || December 30 || @ Los Angeles Kings || 3–5 || 16–17–6 || 38 || 
|-

|- style="background:#cfc;"
| 40 || January 3 || @ Atlanta Flames || 3–1 || 17–17–6 || 40 || 
|- style="background:#fcf;"
| 41 || January 7 || @ Buffalo Sabres || 0–2 || 17–18–6 || 40 || 
|- style="background:#fcf;"
| 42 || January 11 || Los Angeles Kings || 2–3 || 17–19–6 || 40 || 
|- style="background:#cfc;"
| 43 || January 13 || @ Chicago Black Hawks || 3–2 || 18–19–6 || 42 || 
|- style="background:#fcf;"
| 44 || January 14 || New York Rangers || 2–5 || 18–20–6 || 42 || 
|- style="background:#cfc;"
| 45 || January 18 || Minnesota North Stars || 6–1 || 19–20–6 || 44 || 
|- style="background:#fcf;"
| 46 || January 20 || @ Montreal Canadiens || 3–6 || 19–21–6 || 44 || 
|- style="background:#cfc;"
| 47 || January 21 || @ Buffalo Sabres || 4–3 || 20–21–6 || 46 || 
|- style="background:#ffc;"
| 48 || January 23 || Detroit Red Wings || 4–4 || 20–21–7 || 47 || 
|- style="background:#cfc;"
| 49 || January 25 || Pittsburgh Penguins || 6–3 || 21–21–7 || 49 || 
|- style="background:#cfc;"
| 50 || January 27 || @ Pittsburgh Penguins || 5–3 || 22–21–7 || 51 || 
|- style="background:#cfc;"
| 51 || January 28 || California Golden Seals || 4–3 || 23–21–7 || 53 || 
|-

|- style="background:#cfc;"
| 52 || February 1 || Vancouver Canucks || 5–4 || 24–21–7 || 55 || 
|- style="background:#ffc;"
| 53 || February 3 || Chicago Black Hawks || 2–2 || 24–21–8 || 56 || 
|- style="background:#ffc;"
| 54 || February 4 || @ Boston Bruins || 2–2 || 24–21–9 || 57 || 
|- style="background:#fcf;"
| 55 || February 7 || @ Los Angeles Kings || 1–2 || 24–22–9 || 57 || 
|- style="background:#cfc;"
| 56 || February 9 || @ Vancouver Canucks || 10–5 || 25–22–9 || 59 || 
|- style="background:#fcf;"
| 57 || February 11 || @ Chicago Black Hawks || 2–7 || 25–23–9 || 59 || 
|- style="background:#cfc;"
| 58 || February 13 || New York Islanders || 8–2 || 26–23–9 || 61 || 
|- style="background:#fcf;"
| 59 || February 15 || Boston Bruins || 1–3 || 26–24–9 || 61 || 
|- style="background:#cfc;"
| 60 || February 17 || @ Montreal Canadiens || 7–6 || 27–24–9 || 63 || 
|- style="background:#cfc;"
| 61 || February 18 || Minnesota North Stars || 5–1 || 28–24–9 || 65 || 
|- style="background:#cfc;"
| 62 || February 20 || @ St. Louis Blues || 5–3 || 29–24–9 || 67 || 
|- style="background:#cfc;"
| 63 || February 25 || @ California Golden Seals || 7–0 || 30–24–9 || 69 || 
|- style="background:#fcf;"
| 64 || February 28 || @ Detroit Red Wings || 5–6 || 30–25–9 || 69 || 
|-

|- style="background:#fcf;"
| 65 || March 1 || Los Angeles Kings || 0–2 || 30–26–9 || 69 || 
|- style="background:#cfc;"
| 66 || March 4 || Toronto Maple Leafs || 10–0 || 31–26–9 || 71 || 
|- style="background:#ffc;"
| 67 || March 7 || @ New York Rangers || 2–2 || 31–26–10 || 72 || 
|- style="background:#cfc;"
| 68 || March 10 || Atlanta Flames || 2–1 || 32–26–10 || 74 || 
|- style="background:#cfc;"
| 69 || March 11 || Pittsburgh Penguins || 3–2 || 33–26–10 || 76 || 
|- style="background:#fcf;"
| 70 || March 14 || @ Toronto Maple Leafs || 1–5 || 33–27–10 || 76 || 
|- style="background:#ffc;"
| 71 || March 18 || Montreal Canadiens || 4–4 || 33–27–11 || 77 || 
|- style="background:#cfc;"
| 72 || March 22 || Vancouver Canucks || 9–0 || 34–27–11 || 79 || 
|- style="background:#fcf;"
| 73 || March 24 || @ New York Islanders || 2–3 || 34–28–11 || 79 || 
|- style="background:#cfc;"
| 74 || March 25 || St. Louis Blues || 5–2 || 35–28–11 || 81 || 
|- style="background:#fcf;"
| 75 || March 28 || @ Buffalo Sabres || 3–6 || 35–29–11 || 81 || 
|- style="background:#cfc;"
| 76 || March 29 || Atlanta Flames || 4–2 || 36–29–11 || 83 || 
|- style="background:#cfc;"
| 77 || March 31 || New York Islanders || 10–2 || 37–29–11 || 85 || 
|-

|- style="background:#fcf;"
| 78 || April 1 || @ Pittsburgh Penguins || 4–5 || 37–30–11 || 85 || 
|-

|-
| Legend:

Playoffs

|- style="background:#fcf;"
| 1 || April 4 || Minnesota North Stars || 0–3 || North Stars lead 1–0 || 
|- style="background:#cfc;"
| 2 || April 5 || Minnesota North Stars || 4–1 || Series tied 1–1 || 
|- style="background:#fcf;"
| 3 || April 7 || @ Minnesota North Stars || 0–5 || North Stars lead 2–1 || 
|- style="background:#cfc;"
| 4 || April 8 || @ Minnesota North Stars || 3–0 || Series tied 2–2 || 
|- style="background:#cfc;"
| 5 || April 10 || Minnesota North Stars || 3–2 OT || Flyers lead 3–2 || 
|- style="background:#cfc;"
| 6 || April 12 || @ Minnesota North Stars || 4–1 || Flyers win 4–2 || 
|-

|- style="background:#cfc;"
| 1 || April 14 || @ Montreal Canadiens || 5–4 OT || Flyers lead 1–0 || 
|- style="background:#fcf;"
| 2 || April 16 || @ Montreal Canadiens || 3–4 OT || Series tied 1–1 || 
|- style="background:#fcf;"
| 3 || April 19 || Montreal Canadiens || 1–2 || Canadiens lead 2–1 || 
|- style="background:#fcf;"
| 4 || April 22 || Montreal Canadiens || 1–4 || Canadiens lead 3–1 || 
|- style="background:#fcf;"
| 5 || April 24 || @ Montreal Canadiens || 3–5 || Canadiens win 4–1 || 
|-

|-
| Legend:

Player statistics

Scoring
 Position abbreviations: C = Center; D = Defense; G = Goaltender; LW = Left Wing; RW = Right Wing
  = Joined team via a transaction (e.g., trade, waivers, signing) during the season. Stats reflect time with the Flyers only.
  = Left team via a transaction (e.g., trade, waivers, release) during the season. Stats reflect time with the Flyers only.

Goaltending

Awards and records

Awards

Records

Among the team records set during the 1972–73 season was a road losing streak of eight games from October 25 to November 26, which was later matched during the 1987–88 season. On February 13, Rick MacLeish became the first Flyer to score four goals in a game, a team record that has been tied but not surpassed in regular season play several times since. MacLeish’s three goals in the second period of that game also tied the team record and the 19 minutes and 47 seconds it took him to score all four goals is the fastest four-goal game in team history. A few weeks later on March 4, MacLeish scored four goals in a game again, this time also tying the team record for points in a single period (4). On March 31, the Flyers scored a team record eight goals during the second period of a game against the New York Islanders. During a 4–1 win over the Minnesota North Stars on April 5, Barry Ashbee became the first Flyer to record three assists in a period during a playoff game. The victory was the Flyers first playoff win since game six of their 1968 series against the St. Louis Blues, snapping a franchise record ten game playoff losing streak.

Milestones

Transactions
The Flyers were involved in the following transactions from May 12, 1972, the day after the deciding game of the 1972 Stanley Cup Finals, through May 10, 1973, the day of the deciding game of the 1973 Stanley Cup Finals.

Trades

Players acquired

Players lost

Signings

Draft picks

Philadelphia's picks at the 1972 NHL Amateur Draft, which was held at the Queen Elizabeth Hotel in Montreal, Quebec, on June 8, 1972. The Flyers traded their tenth round pick, 148th overall, to the Minnesota North Stars for cash during the draft.

Farm teams
The Flyers were affiliated with the Richmond Robins of the AHL, the San Diego Gulls of the WHL, and the Jersey Devils of the EHL.

Notes

References
General
 
 
 
Specific

Philadelphia
Philadelphia
Philadelphia Flyers seasons
Philad
Philad